Mohamed Khalil Jendoubi (born 1 June 2002) is a Tunisian taekwondo practitioner. Representing Tunisia at the 2020 Summer Olympics held in Tokyo, Japan, he won silver in the men's 58 kg taekwondo event.

Career 

In 2018, he won one of the bronze medals in the boy's 48kg event at the Summer Youth Olympics held in Buenos Aires, Argentina.

In 2019, he competed in the men's finweight event at the World Taekwondo Championships held in Manchester, United Kingdom. In that same year, he represented Tunisia at the 2019 African Games held in Rabat, Morocco, and he won the gold medal in the men's 54kg event.

At the 2021 African Taekwondo Championships held in Dakar, Senegal, he won the gold medal in the men's 58kg event. A few months later, he won the silver medal in the men's 58kg event at the 2020 Summer Olympics held in Tokyo, Japan.

He won the gold medal in the men's 58kg event at the 2022 African Taekwondo Championships held in Kigali, Rwanda. He won one of the bronze medals in the men's flyweight event at the 2022 World Taekwondo Championships held in Guadalajara, Mexico.

Achievements

References

External links 
 

Living people
2002 births
Place of birth missing (living people)
Tunisian male taekwondo practitioners
African Games gold medalists for Tunisia
African Games medalists in taekwondo
Competitors at the 2019 African Games
Taekwondo practitioners at the 2018 Summer Youth Olympics
Taekwondo practitioners at the 2020 Summer Olympics
Medalists at the 2020 Summer Olympics
Olympic silver medalists for Tunisia
Olympic taekwondo practitioners of Tunisia
Olympic medalists in taekwondo
World Taekwondo Championships medalists
21st-century Tunisian people